Venice Island may refer to:

Venice Island (California), an island in the Sacramento-San Joaquin River Delta in California
Venice Island (Pennsylvania), formed by the Schuylkill River Canal, near the Manayunk section of Philadelphia

See also 

 Venice (disambiguation)